Tangchi (汤池镇) could refer to the following towns in China:

Tangchi, Tailai County, in Heilongjiang
Tangchi, Dandong, in Zhenxing District, Dandong, Liaoning
Tangchi, Dashiqiao, in Liaoning
Tangchi, Lujiang County, in Anhui
Tangchi, Shucheng County, in Anhui
Tangchi, Yingcheng County, in Hubei
Tangchi, Yiliang County, in Yunnan